Bajakapura is a village in Kathalal Taluka in Kheda district of Gujarat State, India.

References 

Villages in Kheda district